Giuseppe Allegrini was an Italian printer and engraver. His birth and death dates are not known. The Allegrini sibship of Francesco, Giuseppe, and Pietro were all involved in publishing industry of Florence.

Allegrini published engravings based on Giuseppe Zocchi's vedute of Florence in 1744. They were commissioned for and financed by Marquis Andrea Gerini. He also printed a series of portraits of notable Florentines: Elogi d'Uomini Illustri Toscani (1766), with engravings cited as completed by:
 Francesco Allegrini
 Carlo and Raimondo Faucci
 Antoni Zaballi
 Gaetano Vascellini
 Cossimo Zocchi
 Giusppe Pazzi

The draughtsman for these engravings were:
 Giuseppe Zocchi
 Giulio Traballesi
 Carlo Gregori
 Giovanni Domenico Campiglia
 Giovanni Masoni
 Domenico Bourbon del Monte
 Cosimo Fioravanti
 Giuseppe Piattoli
 Joseph Magni
 Alessandro Coppoli
 Giuseppe Panzi
 Lorenzo Feliciati
 Santi Cardini Aretino
 Giuseppe Valiani Pistoiese
 Diacinto Fabbroni
 Gennaro Landi
 Raimondo Faucci
 Cosimo Zocchi
 Iacopo Nerli
 Francesco Sacconi
 Tommaso Gentile
 Iacinto Giusti
 Angiolo Magni
 Ansano Luti
 F. Forzoni; G. Vascellini
 Alessandro Morrona
 Sigismondo Martini
 Giovanni Carlo Amidei
 Innocentio Ansaldi
 Angiolo Lorenzo de Giudici
 Giuseppe Sorbolini
 Luzio Borghesi Senese
 Antonio di Vincenzio Meucci
 Giovanni Battista Rondinelli
 Antellagia Scarlatti
 Agnolo Pandolfini (artist)
 Vincenzio Fortuna

References

Italian printers
Italian engravers
Year of birth unknown
Year of death unknown